Przemysław Pitry (born 11 September 1981) is a Polish football manager and former professional player, currently serving as an assistant coach of GKS Tychy.

Career
He also played for Zagłębie Sosnowiec and Amica Wronki.

On 5 October 2018, Pitry signed for Rymer Rybnik. In the summer 2019, Pitry then joined LKS Jawiszowice. The club announced on 16 December 2019, that Pitry would be the club's new manager.

National team
Pitry was called upon for the Poland national football team, but has not played in any official game so far. His only game in a Polish jersey was a charity game versus Górny Śląsk in December 2006.

References

External links
 

Living people
1981 births
People from Pszczyna
Sportspeople from Silesian Voivodeship
Association football forwards
Polish footballers
Zagłębie Sosnowiec players
Amica Wronki players
Lech Poznań players
Górnik Zabrze players
GKS Katowice players
Górnik Łęczna players
Ekstraklasa players
I liga players
Polish football managers